Clifton Rugby Football Club is an English rugby union club founded in Clifton, Bristol. Over the years the club's home games have been played in a variety of locations in northern Bristol, though never in Clifton itself; since 1976 they have been based at the southern end of Cribbs Causeway. Clifton RFC play in the fourth tier of the English rugby union league system; National League 2 West.

History
Clifton RFC is Bristol's oldest club, and one of the oldest in the world. Clifton Rugby Club was formed on 27 September 1872 at the Kings Arms on Blackboy Hill in Clifton, Bristol. The pub still stands, although it was rebuilt in 1902, and refurbished in the late 1990s. Clifton is the 32nd oldest club in the United Kingdom, the 21st oldest in England, the 2nd oldest in the South West (Bath Rugby older by seven years) and the oldest in Bristol. In 1909 a combined Bristol and Clifton RFC team, captained by Percy Down, lost to Australia 11–3.

Clifton's Cribbs Causeway ground also hosted the Bristol Packers American football team in the late 1980s and early 1990s.

Honours
 Bass South West Merit Table champions: 1979–80
 South West Division 1 champions: 1988–89
 Area League South runner-up:  1989–90 (promoted)
 Courage League Division 4 champions: 1993–94
 London 1 v South West 1 promotion play-off winner: 2005–06
 South West Division 1 champions: 2008–09
 Bristol Combination Cup winners (5): 2008–09, 2013–14, 2015–16, 2016–17, 2017–18

Current standings

Notable former players
Internationals
 Billy Meakes (Australia)
 Ellis Genge (England)
 Callum Braley (Italy)
 Olly Kohn
 Rhys Oakley both (Wales)

British & Irish Lions
 Mako Vunipola (England)
 Mark Regan (England)
 Frederick Belson (England)

References

External links
 Official website
 History Project for Clifton RFC

English rugby union teams
Rugby clubs established in 1872
Rugby union in Bristol
Clifton, Bristol